A rivet is a mechanical fastener.

Rivet or rivets may also refer to:

 Rivet (surname), a list of people so named
 Rivet (horse), a racehorse
 Apache Rivet, an Apache Software Foundation project
 Rivet High School (Vincennes, Indiana), a Roman Catholic private school
 Rivets, a comic strip syndicated by cartoonist George Sixta
 Rivet, a fictional character from the video game Ratchet & Clank: Rift Apart
 Fast Workers, a 1933 film also titled Rivets

See also
 PRR 4800, an electric locomotive nicknamed "Old Rivets"
 Rivett (disambiguation)
 Rivette (disambiguation)